Florian Hufsky (November 13, 1986 – December 16, 2009) was an Austrian new media artist, Computer Hacker, political activist, founder and former board member of the Pirate Party of Austria. He studied graphic design at the University of Applied Arts Vienna, but committed suicide before he could finish his studies.

Hufsky was a founding member of both the Viennese branch of Graffiti Research Lab and soup.io. He also created the Super Mario derivate Super Mario War, was a member of the programming and design group "72dpiarmy" and of Vienna's hackerspace Metalab. In cooperation with Michael Zeltner he enhanced the open source laser graffiti software of the Graffiti Research Lab (GRL) in New York, and participated at the Ars Electronica Festival in Linz as well as at the 2007 DigiTaika in Helsinki.

Hufsky organized the first international conference of the pirate parties, together with Jürgen 'Juxi' Leitner and support from Andreas Leo Findeisen and Johannes Grenzfurthner.
At the PPI general assembly 2011 Rickard Falkvinge honoured Hufsky's involvement in helping to start the international movement by dedicating his closing keynote to him.

References

External links

Pirate Party of Austria politicians
Austrian activists
New media artists
Video game designers
People from Villach
Suicides in Austria
1986 births
2009 suicides
2009 deaths